Sir Charles Frederick Hadden  (2 June 1854 – 13 September 1924) was a British Army officer who served as Master-General of the Ordnance.

Early life and education
Hadden was born in Nottingham, the son of Charles Stanton Hadden, a Ceylon coffee planter. He was educated at Elstree School and Cheltenham College before attending the Royal Military Academy, Woolwich.

Military career
Hadden was commissioned into the Royal Artillery in 1873. He was appointed Chief Inspector at the Royal Arsenal at Woolwich in 1893 and then became a Member of the Ordnance Committee and an Associate Member of Explosives Committee in 1901.

He was made Commandant of the Ordnance College and Director of Artillery in 1904 before moving on to be Master-General of the Ordnance in 1907. In that capacity he was a member of a special committee set up by Prime Minister H. H. Asquith to exploit aerial construction in 1909. He was appointed President of Ordnance Board and Royal Artillery Committee in 1913.

Personal life

In 1885, Hadden married Frances Mabel Strong, the daughter of Col. Clement Strong of the Coldstream Guard.

He lived at Rossway near Berkhamsted.

He died suddenly of heart failure, aged 70.

References

 

|-

1854 births
1924 deaths
Royal Artillery officers
British Army generals of World War I
Knights Commander of the Order of the Bath
People educated at Elstree School
People educated at Cheltenham College
Graduates of the Royal Military Academy, Woolwich
Military personnel from Nottingham
British Army major generals